Bobby Digital may refer to:

Bobby Digital (Jamaican producer), Jamaican dancehall producer
Bobby Digital or RZA (born 1969), American rapper and music producer